is a Japanese funk band, formed in Osaka, Japan. It has been active since 1992. The band is now based in Tokyo, Japan.

Band members
Current
 Ryo Nakata, vocal & keyboards
 Kentaro Yamagata, trumpet
 Taihei Awaji, trumpet
 Shimon Mukai, tenor saxophone
 Dan Hayami, guitar
 Yuichi Ikeda, guitar
 Tsuyoshi Ouchi, bass guitar
 Soki Kimura, drums

Former
 Yohchi Masago, trumpet
 Katsutoshi Hiraishi, trombone
 Dai Nakamura, bass guitar

Discography

Albums
 What It Is – What It Was (RD Records, 2000)
 Rumble'n Struggle (RD Records, 2001)
 Thankful (RD Records, 2004)
 Eyewitness to the Live in Heavy Funk System (RD Records, 2005)
 I Am What I Am by Marva Whitney Produced by Osaka Monaurail (Shout!/P-Vine, 2006)
 Reality for the People (P-Vine, 2006)
 Amen, Brother (and other Funk instrumentals) (Unique Records, 2007) aka Introducing Undercover Express (Japanese title on P-Vine) 
 Live in Spain (Shout!/P-Vine, 2009)
 State of the World (King Records, 2011)
 Riptide (Unique Records/Shout!, 2014)

Singles
 "New Type Thing" (pts.1&2) (RD Records, Jan., 2001)
 "Down and Out" (pts.1&2) (RD Records, Jan., 2001)
 "Just Bein' Free" (pts.1&2) (RD Records, Jun., 2001)
 "Mind Power (pts.1&2)" (RD Records, Nov., 2004)
 "Double-Up, Now" b/w "Groovy, Groovy, Groovy (Pt.2)" (RD Records, Nov., 2004)
 "Hot Pants Road" (pt.1) b/w "Pick Up the Pieces One By One" (pt.2) (RD Records, Apr., 2005)
 "Pick Up The Pieces One By One" (pt.1) b/w "Hot Pants Road" (pt.2) (RD Records, Apr., 2005)
 "I Am What I Am" (pts.1&2) by Martha Whitney with Osaka Monaurail (RD Records, Jun., 2006)
 "Soulsisters (of the World Unite)" b/w "It's Her Thing" by Martha Whitney with Osaka Monaurail (Shout!, Mar., 2007)
 "Quicksand" b/w "Ceora" (Shout!, Apr., 2007)
 "We Got One (A Show)" (Our Label, 2007)* "Signed, Sealed and Delivered - I'm Yours" b/w "Supershine #9" (Our Label, 2009)
 "Tighten Up" b/w "Soulful Strut" (Unique Records, 2009)
 "Hung Up" (Unique Records, 2009)
 "No Trouble On The Mountain" (featuring Shirley Davis) b/w "The Archipelago" (Unique Records, 2011)

References

External links
  
 Facebook page 

Japanese musical groups
Musical groups from Osaka